This is a list of football games played by the Uzbekistan national football team between 2000 and 2009.

2000

2001

2002

2003

2004

2005

2006

2007

2008

2009

See also
 Uzbekistan national football team
 Uzbekistan national football team results (1992–99)
 Uzbekistan national football team results (2010–19)
 Uzbekistan national football team results – B Matches

References

External links
Uzbekistan International Matches – Details 2000–2009

2000s in Uzbekistani sport
2000